Cameron Alan Ross Coles (born 23 May 1974) an Australian-born Scottish former cricketer.

Coles was born in May 1974 at Moura, Queensland. Coles moved to Scotland as a child and was educated at St Modan's High School in Stirling. A club cricketer who captained Grange Cricket Club, Coles made two appearances in List A one-day cricket for Scotland in the 2004 totesport League, playing against Worcestershire at Worcester and Nottinghamshire at Trent Bridge. In these two matches, he scored a total of 7 runs with a highest score of 5.

References

External links
 

1974 births
Living people
People from Moura, Queensland
Australian emigrants to Scotland
People educated at St Modan's High School
Scottish cricketers